"Sugar" is the first single from the album Witching Hour by English electronic music band Ladytron. This song featured on the video game Need for Speed: Carbon and Need for Speed Carbon Own the City. It charted at number 45 in the United Kingdom.

Track listing
CD single
 "Sugar" - 2:54
 "Tender Talons" - 3:30
 "Sugar" (Jagz Kooner Remix) - 5:23

7"
 "Sugar"
 "Fighting in Built Up Areas"

12"
 "Sugar" - 2:50
 "Sugar" (Archigram Remix) - 6:13
 "Sugar" (Playgroup Vocal) - 5:09
 "Sugar" ('M' Ladytronomy Remix) - 5:36

References

2005 singles
Ladytron songs
2005 songs
Songs written by Daniel Hunt
Song recordings produced by Jim Abbiss